Irvington is an unincorporated community and census-designated place (CDP) in Irvington Township, Kossuth County, Iowa, United States. As of the 2010 census it had a population of 38.

History
"Old" Irvington was founded in 1856. When the Northwestern Railway was being built through Irvington Township in 1881, the townsite was moved and "New" Irvington was laid out. The community was named for author Washington Irving.

Irvington's population was 33 in 1902, and 95 in 1925.

Geography
Irvington is in southern Kossuth County, in the southwest corner of Irvington Township. It sits on a low bluff on the east side of the East Fork of the Des Moines River.

Demographics

References

Census-designated places in Kossuth County, Iowa
1856 establishments in Iowa
Populated places established in 1856